The Public Investment Fund (PIF) is the sovereign wealth fund of Saudi Arabia. It is among the largest sovereign wealth funds in the world with total estimated assets of  billion ( billion). It was created in 1971 for the purpose of investing funds on behalf of the Government of Saudi Arabia. The wealth fund has been controlled by Crown Prince Mohammed bin Salman, Saudi Arabia's de facto ruler since 2015.

The present governor of PIF is Yasir Al-Rumayyan, serving under bin Salman. The lack of transparency and close control by the Saudi Arabian government has generated much controversy.

History

The Saudi Arabian Public Investment Fund (PIF) was established by the King Faisal bin Abdulaziz Al Saud in 1971 by Royal Decree M/24 with the stated intent to provide financing support for projects of strategic significance to the national economy. For much of its history, the PIF was a passive entity that oversaw the Saudi state's equity in listed firms. When neighboring petrostates began using their sovereign wealth funds for influence, Saudi Arabia followed them. The PIF expanded its staff from 50 in 2015 to nearly 500 in 2018.

In July 2014, the Council of Ministers granted the PIF authority to fund new companies inside and outside the Kingdom, either independently or in cooperation with the public and private sectors, without the council's prior approval. In March 2015, oversight of PIF was moved from the Ministry of Finance to the Council of Economic and Development Affairs (CEDA). As part of this process, a new PIF was appointed, chaired by Crown Prince Mohammed bin Salman. The board says PIF is aligned with the government's Vision 2030 with the aim to diversify the economy. To bolster the resources of the PIF and help in the financing of investments into foreign companies such as Uber and Tesla, the PIF received cash from the Saudi Central Bank, issued debt, and benefitted from the proceeds of the privatisation of Saudi state assets.

A 2021 report by Global SWF found that PIF's Governance, Sustainability, and Resilience (GSR) score had risen by 12% to an overall score of 40% (out of 100%) that year. This was partially attributed to the fact that PIF had started to build a dedicated ESG (Environmental, Social, and Sustainability) team.

Investment projects
The PIF has 38% stake in Posco Engineering & Construction Co., a 5% stake in Uber (for $3.5 billion), and a 5% stake in the video game companies Capcom and Nexon (for $1 billion). In March 2016, it was announced that ownership of Saudi Aramco would be transferred to the PIF and that the Kingdom will seek to list 5 percent of Aramco's shares by 2017. PIF owns Qiddiya, spearheads the Red Sea Project for luxury beach resorts, and owns the closed joint-stock company named Neom. PIF owns a 5.7% stake (valued at $500 million) in concert distributor Live Nation. In 2020, PIF purchased minority stakes in major U.S. companies including Boeing, Facebook and Citigroup. PIF disclosed a $713.7 million stake in Boeing, around $522 million in Citigroup, a $522 million stake in Facebook, a $495.8 million stake in Disney and a $487.6 million stake in Bank of America. It also disclosed a small stake in Berkshire Hathaway. PIF also disclosed an $827.7 million stake in oil company BP. In 2020, PIF purchased a 2.32% stake (valued at $1.5 billion) in India's Jio Platforms, and reduced its holdings in US stocks to $7 billion from $10.1 billion in the third quarter. It instead left a stake of $2.7 billion in Uber.

In 2016, SoftBank Group and the PIF announced that they would establish a SoftBank Vision Fund which aims to invest up to $45 billion over five years in the tech sector. The SoftBank Group confirmed that during the fiscal year 2019–2020, the Vision Fund, in which Saudi Arabia invested $45 billion, incurred a loss calculated at $17.7 billion, after the value of investments was written down. The losses were related to the investments in WeWork and Uber Technologies Inc. In the 39-year history of SoftBank, the Saudi Arabia-backed funds paid the group its worst-ever losses, where the overall company losses were 1.36 trillion yen (more than $12.5 billion).

During 2017 the Saudi-US CEO Forum, which was part of President Donald Trump's official trip to Saudi Arabia, PIF announced plans to "invest $40 billion in infrastructure projects, mostly in the U.S." Blackstone, whose CEO and founder—Stephen A. Schwarzman—is a top supporter of Trump, entered into a non-binding memorandum by which the PIF committed $20 billion to the project. During the CEO Forum US-Saudi, arms deals were announced including a pledge to "assemble 150 Lockheed Martin Black Hawk helicopters" in Saudi Arabia, representing 450 jobs in Saudi Arabia" as part of the "$6 billion deal for Black Hawks."

In March 2019, it was revealed that PIF paid a New York communications firm, Karv Communications, $120,000 a month in order to repair Saudis' damaged reputation after the Assassination of Jamal Khashoggi.

In 2021, they purchased stakes in the American video game companies Electronic Arts, Take-Two Interactive, and Activision Blizzard. In May 2022, they purchased a 5% stake in the Japanese video game company Nintendo, and the following month, an 8% stake in Embracer Group with a  investment.

PIF owns a major indirect stake in Twitter, although many Saudis who use the platform for political dissent and activism are arbitrarily arrested and imprisoned.

Former Donald Trump administration officials 
In 2021, PIF invested $2 billion into a private equity firm that had been newly formed by Jared Kushner, Donald Trump's son-in-law, shortly after he left the White House. PIF advisers raised questions about the merits of the investment, but PIF management overruled the advisers. By April 2022, Kushner's equity firm primarily depended on Saudi money, as it only had $2.5 billion under its management. Within the Donald Trump administration, Kushner was a staunch defender of Saudi ruler Mohammed bin Salman. According to ethics experts, the investment created the appearance of potential payback for Kushner.

In 2021, PIF invested $1 billion in the investment fund established by former Donald Trump administration official Steven Mnuchin just after he left government.

In May 2022, it was reported that Affinity Partners was planning to direct Saudi Arabia's PIF money to Israel. There were multiple meetings by Kushner had with a range of Israeli startups before he picked two of them to make an investment. The Kingdom didn't have diplomatic relations with Israel and was neither a part of the Abraham Accords. Saudi Arabia was warned by Kushner that it could lose the opportunities in Israel to its neighbors who signed the accords, including the UAE and Bahrain. Through Kushner's firm, Saudi could open to Israeli businesses, which could prove to be lucrative for the Arab country. Affinity Partner's investment in Israeli startups was agreed to by Saudi officials and was also believed to have been approved by Crown Prince Mohammed. Many saw it as a groundwork for a potential normalization of relations between Saudi and Israel. This will be the first known time that money from the Saudi's sovereign wealth fund will go to Israel.

Takeover of Newcastle United

On 14 April 2020, it emerged that a deal to transfer ownership of Newcastle United F.C. for £300m had been agreed between incumbent owner Mike Ashley and a prospective buying consortium consisting of the Public Investment Fund, PCP Capital Partners and Reuben Brothers. However, the Premier League controversially refused to ratify the deal and so Mike Ashley subsequently engaged in various legal proceedings against the Premier League in an attempt to complete the takeover. On 7 October 2021, it was announced that the club would be acquired by the consortium led by the Public Investment Fund, after the Premier League stated it had received "legally binding assurances that the Kingdom of Saudi Arabia will not control Newcastle United Football Club".

Human rights organizations criticized the Premier League for allowing PIF to purchase a Premier League club. Amnesty International pointed to Saudi Arabia's human rights record, and said that the Premier League must introduce standards whereby human rights violators cannot own Premier League clubs. Amnesty called the takeover "an extremely bitter blow for human rights defenders." Hatice Cengiz, the fiancée of Saudi journalist Jamal Khashoggi, who was murdered by operatives of the Saudi regime, urged the Premier League to block PIF's takeover.

In April 2021, Saudi crown prince Mohammed bin Salman reportedly asked British Prime Minister Boris Johnson to intervene so that the Premier League would approve PIF's takeover of Newcastle. The attempted takeover was "a blatant example of Saudi sportswashing", according to Kate Allen of Amnesty International UK. The British government blocked details of its talks with the Premier League regarding the Saudi takeover, saying the disclosure could "harm" relations with Saudi Arabia. The other 19 Premier League clubs condemned the takeover, saying it damaged the Premier League's brand.

Establishment of LIV Golf

In October 2021, a division of the PIF, Golf Saudi funded the establishment of the LIV Golf Investments, with Greg Norman declared to be its CEO.  The private company introduced a professional tour, LIV Golf, also referred to as the Super Golf League. It came as a new challenge against the PGA Tour, after the World Golf Tour and the Premier Golf League.

LIV Golf's strategy differed from other leagues as it offered the richest golf tournaments in history and was able to convince star players to take part. In June 2022, LIV Golf Invitational Series commenced its eight-event journey, with total prize money of $255 million. Saudi PIF backed the event with $2 billion in funds. Besides, LIV Golf offered the winner's prize money of $4 million, in comparison to PGA Championship’s $2.7 million. Some of the prominent professional golf players participated in the event, including Phil Mickelson, Dustin Johnson, Graeme McDowell, Sergio García, Martin Kaymer, Louis Oosthuizen, Charl Schwartzel and Lee Westwood. Dustin Johnson was allegedly paid $150 million to join the Saudi-backed series. Phil Mickelson also committed to the series after signing a $200 million contract. However, some other renowned players also rejected the new league. Tiger Woods turned down an offer worth nearly $1 billion. A vocal critic of the tournament, Rory McIlroy also stood with PGA Tour and criticized players who joined LIV, stating they were "taking the easy way out".

LIV Golf was also condemned as another sportswashing tool of Saudi Arabia, which is accused of several human rights violations, including the assassination of Jamal Khashoggi. The CEO Greg Norman and star players had to face questions about their association with LIV Golf, despite the Kingdom's abysmal human rights records. Norman dismissed the questions saying, "We've all made mistakes" and that Saudi wanted "to move forward".

Phil Mickelson also gave a controversial statement saying, the Saudis are "scary motherf–kers to be involved with". He said, "We know they killed Khashoggi and have a horrible record on human rights". Despite that, Mickelson joined the LIV Golf calling it "a once-in-a-lifetime opportunity" to reshape PGA Tour. Graeme McDowell also gave similar answers and said, "We're not politicians, we're professional golfers. If Saudi Arabia wants to use the game of golf as a way for them to get to where they want to be, I think we're proud to help them on that journey."

Criticism
PIF has been characterized as among the least transparent sovereign wealth funds in the world. In 2016, The Wall Street Journal noted that none of the fund's investments were named. According to Steffen Hertog, a professor at the London School of Economics, the PIF "is seen as opaque, a black box. Few know what's going on there, including sometimes other government ministries." As the PIF is a ministry-operated company with an overwhelming focus on domestic investments, some scholars characterize it as a "quasi-sovereign wealth fund."

The governance structure of PIF has been called into question, specifically with respect to how much control Mohammad bin Salman holds on decision making at PIF. In October 2022, Yasir Al-Rumayyan (the governor of PIF) gave an interview where he spoke about resisting the ambitious international stock buying activities being promulgated by Mohammad bin Salman at the beginning of 2020 as the world was grappling with COVID-19. The concern was that giving the PIF tens of billions of dollars from the Saudi central bank to fund this stock buying was risky and might devalue the local currency. Although Mohammad bin Salman is the chairman of PIF, PIF has denied "any suggestion that the decision-making or conduct of the board of PIF is unduly influenced (or influenced in any way contrary to the principles of good governance) by the crown prince." Yasir Al-Rumayyan claims he was overruled by Salman of Saudi Arabia, who is still officially king. Yasir Al-Rumayyan also admitted that of the $35 billion spent by the PIF as part of this activity, it soon rose to $49 billion when markets rose.

The fund's domestic investments tend to go to firms owned by elites with long-standing personal connections to the Saudi state.

Some of PIF's assets were transferred to the organization in 2017 after the Saudi regime conducted an "anti-corruption" purge whereby assets of 400 of Saudi Arabia's richest individuals were seized by the regime.

See also

 Economy of Saudi Arabia
 MiSK Foundation

References

External links

Public Profile PIF from SWFI

Business organisations based in Saudi Arabia
Organizations established in 1971
 
Sovereign wealth funds
1971 establishments in Saudi Arabia